Constellation is a series of outdoor 2000 bronze sculptures by American artist Tad Savinar, installed at Holladay Park in northeast Portland, Oregon, United States. The work's three "distinct elements" include:

 Constellation (Vase of Flowers) or Constellation: Flowers from a Neighborhood Garden, a slender vase of daisies, hydrangeas and other flowers;
 Constellation (Molecule) or Constellation: Isolated Molecule for a Good Neighborhood, an abstract molecule representing a "good neighborhood"; and
 Constellation: Neighborhood Gardiner or simply Constellation,  a female figure carrying gardening shears.

According to the Regional Arts & Culture Council, which administers the installation, "This project attempts to illustrate the connection between the personal front yard garden and the civic park/garden." The figure depicts a neighborhood activist (Carolyn Marks Backs or Carolyn Marks-Bax, depending on the source). The decision to visualize backs and the objects depicted in the molecule were chosen by the Sullivan Gulch Neighborhood Association. Objects include a bagel, coffee mug, garden tool, house, milk carton, school, a family, and trees. Constellation was funded by the City of Portland's Percent for Art program. It is part of the City of Portland and Multnomah County Public Art Collection courtesy of the Regional Arts & Culture Council.

See also

 2000 in art

References

External links
 Constellation (Vase of Flowers) at the Public Art Archive

2000 establishments in Oregon
2000 sculptures
Botanical art
Bronze sculptures in Oregon
Outdoor sculptures in Portland, Oregon
Sculptures of women in Oregon
Statues in Portland, Oregon
Sullivan's Gulch, Portland, Oregon